Laurențiu Tudor may refer to:

 Laurențiu Tudor (footballer, born 1976), Romanian football manager and footballer
 Laurențiu Tudor (footballer, born 1997), Romanian footballer